Octostruma is a genus of ants in the subfamily Myrmicinae. The genus is found in the Neotropics.

Species

Octostruma amrishi (Makhan, 2007)
Octostruma ascrobicula Longino, 2013
Octostruma ascrobis Longino, 2013
Octostruma balzani (Emery, 1894)
Octostruma batesi (Emery, 1894)
Octostruma betschi Perrault, 1988
Octostruma convallis Longino, 2013
Octostruma convallisur Longino, 2013
Octostruma cyrtinotum Longino, 2013
Octostruma excertirugis Longino, 2013
Octostruma gymnogon Longino, 2013
Octostruma gymnosoma Longino, 2013
Octostruma iheringi (Emery, 1888)
Octostruma impressa Palacio, 1997
Octostruma inca Brown & Kempf, 1960
Octostruma leptoceps Longino, 2013
Octostruma limbifrons Longino, 2013
Octostruma lutzi (Wheeler, 1913)
Octostruma megabalzani Longino, 2013
Octostruma montanis Longino, 2013
Octostruma obtusidens Longino, 2013
Octostruma onorei (Baroni Urbani & De Andrade, 2007)
Octostruma petiolata (Mayr, 1887)
Octostruma pexidorsum Longino, 2013
Octostruma planities Longino, 2013
Octostruma rugifera (Mayr, 1887)
Octostruma rugiferoides Brown & Kempf, 1960
Octostruma schusteri Longino, 2013
Octostruma stenognatha Brown & Kempf, 1960
Octostruma stenoscapa Palacio, 1997
Octostruma triangulabrum Longino, 2013
Octostruma triquetrilabrum Longino, 2013
Octostruma trithrix Longino, 2013
Octostruma wheeleri (Mann, 1922)

References

External links

Myrmicinae
Ant genera